The Confederation of Workers of the Republic of Panama (CTRP) is a national trade union center located in Panama. It has a claimed membership of 35,000 and is affiliated with the International Trade Union Confederation.

References

Trade unions in Panama
International Trade Union Confederation
Trade unions established in 1956